Nososticta koongarra is a species of Australian damselfly in the family Platycnemididae,
commonly known as a citrine threadtail. 
It has only been found on the Arnhem Land escarpment in Northern Territory, where it inhabits streams.

Nososticta koongarra is a small, slender damselfly; males are coloured black with bright blue markings and yellow tinted wings,
females are black with yellowish-white markings and clear wings.

Gallery

See also
 List of Odonata species of Australia

References 

Platycnemididae
Odonata of Australia
Insects of Australia
Endemic fauna of Australia
Taxa named by J.A.L. (Tony) Watson
Taxa named by Günther Theischinger
Insects described in 1984
Damselflies